K. Ramasamy may refer to:
 K. Ramasamy (politician), Indian politician
 K. Ramasamy (scientist) (born 1948), vice chancellor of Tamil Nadu Agricultural University